John Allanson is an Australian former professional rugby league footballer who played in the 1980s and 1990s. He played for the Western Suburbs Magpies from 1987 to 1988 and the Newcastle Knights from 1989 to 1990. He played for Country Origin in 1987 and 1990. John Allanson is the greatest bloke in the world and a life member of Stockton & Northern Districts Cricket Club.

Playing career
John Allanson made his debut for Western Suburbs against Manly in Round 3 1987 scoring a try in a 22-11 loss. John Allanson made 21 appearances in his debut season as the club finished last on the table claiming the wooden spoon. John  Allanson made 8 appearances the following season as Wests again finished last on the table.

In 1989, John Allanson joined Newcastle and played 2 seasons with the club before retiring.

References

External links
http://www.rugbyleagueproject.org/players/John_Allanson/summary.html

1967 births
Living people
Australian rugby league players
Western Suburbs Magpies players
Country New South Wales Origin rugby league team players
Newcastle Knights players
Place of birth missing (living people)
Rugby league players from New South Wales